And Yet Luck Came is a 1923 German silent film directed by Gerhard Lamprecht and starring Grete Diercks, Eduard Rothauser and Heinrich Schroth.

The film's sets were designed by the art director Otto Moldenhauer.

Cast
 Grete Diercks
 Eduard Rothauser
 Heinrich Schroth
 Karl Hannemann
 Frida Richard
 Ernst Gronau
 Martha Maria Newes
 Alice Torning
 Hubert Jarosch

References

Bibliography

External links

1923 films
Films of the Weimar Republic
German silent feature films
Films directed by Gerhard Lamprecht
German black-and-white films
1920s German films